The Staten Island FerryHawks are an American minor-league professional baseball team based in the New York City borough of Staten Island. They are a member of the North Division of the Atlantic League of Professional Baseball, a "partner league" of Major League Baseball They play their home games at SIUH Community Park, the former home of the Staten Island Yankees, which is in the St. George neighborhood and overlooks the Manhattan skyline across New York Harbor.

In 2021, Staten Islanders chose the name "FerryHawks" in a team-sponsored fan ballot. The name refers to the iconic Staten Island Ferry, which connects the borough to Manhattan across the Harbor, and to the red-tailed (Buteo jamaicensis) and Cooper's hawks (Accipiter cooperii) native to Staten Island. The team plans to use "DragonSlayers" and "HarborHeroes," the other two contestants in the ballot, for limited promotions. "DragonSlayers" refers to the St. George neighborhood, named for the ancient Cappadocian soldier Saint George whose legend involves slaying a dragon. The "HarborHeroes" name alludes to first responders (police, fire, and ambulance), especially those who patrol New York Harbor.

History
 
The start of the 2020 season was postponed due to the COVID-19 pandemic before ultimately being cancelled on June 30. On November 7, 2020, the New York Yankees announced that they were withdrawing from Staten Island along with abandoning their affiliation with the Trenton Thunder and moving forward with the Somerset Patriots, but they would seek to place an Atlantic League team at Richmond County Bank Ballpark in 2021. On December 3, 2020, the Staten Island Yankees announced that the club would cease operations.

In 2021, the New York Economic Development Corporation (NYCEDC) was in talks with the Atlantic League to have an expansion team play at the stadium in 2022. On June 5, 2021, Atlantic League President Rick White announced that Staten Island "is close" to getting a franchise for the 2022 season.

On July 24, 2021, Staten Island Borough President James Oddo, announced that the new franchise would be owned by Staten Island Entertainment LLC, an investment group including John Catsimatidis, Dany Garcia, Eric Shuffler (a New Jersey politician), Colin Jost, Pete Davidson, and Michael Che. On August 2, 2021, the Atlantic League board of directors approved the ownership group's application to join the league. On August 17, 2021, it was reported that the ballpark's lease was transferred from the Staten Island Yankees to Staten Island Entertainment.

On April 8, 2022, Kelsie Whitmore signed with the Staten Island FerryHawks. She debuted with them as a pinch runner on April 22 and while with them became the first woman to start an Atlantic League game on May 1, playing as a left fielder. She was hitless in three plate appearances but recorded two putouts in two chances in the field, catching fly balls hit by Gastonia Honey Hunters batters Reece Hampton and Johnny Davis. On May 4, Whitmore became the first woman to pitch in an Atlantic League game when she made her first pitching appearance for Staten Island; entering the game with the bases loaded and two outs, she retired Ryan Jackson, a former major leaguer, on a fly out to end the inning.

Season-by-season record

Logos and uniforms

The Staten Island FerryHawks logo features a copper-colored hawk wearing a baseball uniform, a ballcap, and holding a bat.  The "Staten Island FerryHawks" wordmark arches over the logo in navy blue and orange. The cap logo includes the interlocking letters "SI" in orange and sky blue outlined in navy blue.

Roster

References

External links
 Official website

2021 establishments in New York City
Atlantic League of Professional Baseball teams
Baseball teams established in 2021
Baseball teams in New York City
History of Staten Island
Professional baseball teams in New York (state)
Sports in Staten Island
Staten Island FerryHawks